In probability theory, the total variation distance is a distance measure for probability distributions. It is an example of a statistical distance metric, and is sometimes called the statistical distance, statistical difference or variational distance.

Definition

Informally, this is the largest possible difference between the probabilities that the two probability distributions can assign to the same event.

Properties

Relation to other distances 
The total variation distance is related to the Kullback–Leibler divergence by Pinsker’s inequality:

One also has the following inequality, due to Bretagnolle and Huber (see, also, Tsybakov), which has the advantage of providing a non-vacuous bound even when :

When  is countable, the total variation distance is related to the L1 norm by the identity:

The total variation distance is related to the Hellinger distance  as follows:

 

These inequalities follow immediately from the inequalities between the 1-norm and the 2-norm.

Connection to transportation theory 

See also
Total variation
Kolmogorov–Smirnov test
Wasserstein metric

References

Probability theory
F-divergences